Admiral Carter may refer to:

John Carter (Royal Navy officer) (1785–1863), British Royal Navy admiral
Powell F. Carter Jr. (1931–2017), U.S. Navy admiral
Samuel P. Carter (1819–1891), U.S. Navy rear admiral
Stuart Bonham Carter (1889–1972), British Royal Navy vice admiral
Walter E. Carter Jr. (born 1959), U.S. Navy vice admiral